Andrea Paroni (born 14 October 1989) is an Italian footballer who plays as a goalkeeper for  club Virtus Entella.

Career statistics

References

1989 births
Living people
People from San Vito al Tagliamento
Footballers from Friuli Venezia Giulia
Italian footballers
Association football goalkeepers
Serie B players
Serie C players
Lega Pro Seconda Divisione players
Serie D players
Udinese Calcio players
Virtus Entella players